Tikitere, also known as "Hell's Gate", is a suburb in Rotorua's most active geothermal area on State Highway 30, between Lake Rotorua and Lake Rotoiti in the Bay of Plenty, New Zealand.  It includes many geothermal features such as steaming lakes, mudpools, fumaroles, a mud volcano and the Kakahi Falls, the largest hot waterfall in the southern hemisphere.

The area is operated under the name "Hell’s Gate", and offers self-guided and guided tours of the geothermal park, information about its history and Māori culture, and a mud spa. It is part of the wider Tikitere-Ruahine geothermal field.

History and culture

The thermal area was formed approximately 10,000 years ago in a series of geothermal eruptions that drained an ancient lake and formed the Lake Rotoiti and Lake Rotorua. The absence of the pressure of the water on top of the rock caused it to create faults from which steam and gases can escape. At less than 2 km below ground, the heat source of this thermal area is shallower than most other thermal areas in the region.

The local Māori tribe Ngāti Rangiteaorere has lived in this area for more than 700 years and remain the owner of this geothermal attraction. Tikitere, the Māori name for the area is derived from the tragic action of a Māori princess, Hurutini, the young wife of an abusive and shameful chief, who threw herself into the boiling hot pool that bears her name today. Upon finding her daughter's body floating in the hot pool, Hurutini's mother cried out a sad lament "Aue teri nei tiki" ("here lies my precious one"), which was shortened to Tikitere and became the name from the thermal reserve and the surrounding area.

"Hells Gate", its most commonly known name, was used following the visit to the geothermal reserve by noted Irish playwright, George Bernard Shaw in 1934 who likened the area to the comments that were made by his theologian colleagues back in England who were explaining to him that the result of the error of his ways as a practising atheist would result in his "going to hell". What he saw at Tikitere moved him to believe that this would be the gateway to hell. His visit to Tikitere was well received by the local Māori owners of the land and as an honour to note the occasion of his visit, the owners decided that this would be the English name for the geothermal area. A destination spa operated at this site as early as 1871, using sulphurous waters from one of the hot pools and from Kakahi Falls.

The Tikitere urban area includes Waiohewa Marae and Rangiwhakaekeau meeting house, belonging to Ngāti Rangiteaorere.

Demographics
Tikitere is part of the larger Waiohewa statistical area.

Tikitere had a population of 702 at the 2018 New Zealand census, an increase of 27 people (4.0%) since the 2013 census, and an increase of 102 people (17.0%) since the 2006 census. There were 240 households, comprising 354 males and 351 females, giving a sex ratio of 1.01 males per female, with 150 people (21.4%) aged under 15 years, 99 (14.1%) aged 15 to 29, 342 (48.7%) aged 30 to 64, and 114 (16.2%) aged 65 or older.

Ethnicities were 80.8% European/Pākehā, 24.8% Māori, 2.6% Pacific peoples, 6.0% Asian, and 3.0% other ethnicities. People may identify with more than one ethnicity.

Although some people chose not to answer the census's question about religious affiliation, 52.1% had no religion, 36.8% were Christian, 1.7% had Māori religious beliefs, 0.9% were Hindu, 0.4% were Buddhist and 0.9% had other religions.

Of those at least 15 years old, 147 (26.6%) people had a bachelor's or higher degree, and 87 (15.8%) people had no formal qualifications. 159 people (28.8%) earned over $70,000 compared to 17.2% nationally. The employment status of those at least 15 was that 315 (57.1%) people were employed full-time, 69 (12.5%) were part-time, and 9 (1.6%) were unemployed.

Waiohewa statistical area

Waiohewa had a population of 1,020 at the 2018 New Zealand census, an increase of 57 people (5.9%) since the 2013 census, and an increase of 129 people (14.5%) since the 2006 census. There were 348 households, comprising 522 males and 498 females, giving a sex ratio of 1.05 males per female. The median age was 44.8 years (compared with 37.4 years nationally), with 210 people (20.6%) aged under 15 years, 156 (15.3%) aged 15 to 29, 495 (48.5%) aged 30 to 64, and 156 (15.3%) aged 65 or older.

Ethnicities were 79.4% European/Pākehā, 30.0% Māori, 2.4% Pacific peoples, 4.4% Asian, and 2.4% other ethnicities. People may identify with more than one ethnicity.

The percentage of people born overseas was 15.6, compared with 27.1% nationally.

Although some people chose not to answer the census's question about religious affiliation, 51.5% had no religion, 37.1% were Christian, 2.1% had Māori religious beliefs, 0.3% were Hindu, 0.3% were Buddhist and 1.5% had other religions.

Of those at least 15 years old, 192 (23.7%) people had a bachelor's or higher degree, and 123 (15.2%) people had no formal qualifications. The median income was $37,800, compared with $31,800 nationally. 204 people (25.2%) earned over $70,000 compared to 17.2% nationally. The employment status of those at least 15 was that 450 (55.6%) people were employed full-time, 108 (13.3%) were part-time, and 18 (2.2%) were unemployed.

Attractions

The features of the  geothermal park can be explored via two easy-walking, relatively flat loop walks, taking 45 to 60 minutes in total.

The lower area is encircled by a loop walk with bridges and viewing platforms, and contains about a dozen hot pools such as "Sodom and Gomorrah" and "Devil's Bath", with depths of 15 to 25 metres. The water in the "Inferno Pools" and "Sodom and Gomorrah" reaches more than  due to minerals in the water elevating its boiling point. Sodom and Gomorrah, named so by Shaw, has on occasion erupted 2 metres out of its pool. The water from the Huritini hot spring is used in Hells Gate's sulphur spas.
The pH level of the water in the pools is typically 3.5 to 5, with the more acidic "Ink Pots" having a pH level of 2, and the "Sulphur Bath" reaching pH 1. Several other geothermal features in this area also bear names given by Shaw.

Separating the lower and upper area is a short easy-walking bush walk along the stream flowing over the Kakahi Falls. The waterfall has always been a special place for local Māori, with warriors using it to cleanse themselves after battles, the sulphur in the water disinfecting wounds. The waterfall's full name is "O Te Mimi O Te Kakahi", named after a chief and noted warrior of Ngāti Rangiteaorere. The stream itself is the overflow from the upper geothermal area.

A larger loop walk takes in the upper geothermal area, which contains expansive hot pools of varying activity as well as steaming fumaroles. Sulphur crystals can be observed in some parts of this area, as well as several mud cauldrons with boiling black mud. This area also contains a large mud volcano, which is currently around 2 metres tall. Mud typically bubbles violently in the crater of the volcano, but the mud volcano hardens roughly every 6 weeks.  A mud eruption follows pressure build-up over 2-3 days, splattering mud over 2 metres around the volcano.

The grey mud and water from one of the pools is used in Hells Gate's mud spa.

Hells Gate's mud spa, adjacent to the entrance, offers mud footpools and several mud baths, and a list of mud packages, therapies and massages. Mud-based beauty products available at the on-site shop. Hells Gate also offers educational programmes for schools.

Rotorua's 3D Maze has been an icon of Tikitere for over 40 years. After challenges caused by Covid-19 in 2021, the maze reopened as Wonderworld 3D Maze Rotorua in December 2022.

Education

Scientific study

Geology
The Tikitere-Ruahine geothermal field is part of the Rotorua Volcanic Centre and has a surface area of  characterised by acid springs, pools and lakelets, fumaroles, hydrothermal explosion craters, hot barren and altered ground and mudpools. The hydrothermal products are a result of acid sulfate condensate after water interaction with rhyolitic, tuff-rich, volcanic substrate which leaves silica residue rather than the similar appearing silica sinters, that precipitate from hot, near-neutral, alkali chloride water in most other geothermal areas. In this area the Rotorua Caldera rim is ill defined as the geothermal area is located on the tectonically subsiding Tikitere Graben.

Biology
The acid waters are known to harbour extremophile bacteria and distinct strains of the OP10 phylogenetic candidate bacterial division have been parially characterised from Tikitere.

References

External links

Hell's Gate Home Page

Taupō Volcanic Zone
Geothermal areas in New Zealand
Rotorua
Ngāti Rangiteaorere
Populated places on Lake Rotorua
Rotorua Volcanic Centre